Matthew Justin Gay is an American professional basketball player who previously played for FIATC Joventut of the Asociación de Clubs de Baloncesto (ACB) Liga ACB. The 5'8" point guard played college basketball for Rochester College before attending the University of Miami.

High school career 
Gay played his first year at Pontiac Central High School. He played varsity basketball one year before leaving for West Bloomfield High School, where Gay played under, head coach, Larry Moore. There Gay averaged 15.2 points per game, 4.2 rebounds, and 8.7 assists per game. At West Bloomfield High School Gay earned McDonald's All American Nominee in 2004.

Profession career 
While playing for FIATC Joventut, Gay averaged close to 15.2 ppg, and more than 8 assist per game.

Personal 
Gay is a father of 5, mother is Maria Gay who passed in 2018.

References 

Year of birth missing (living people)
Living people
American expatriate basketball people in Spain
American men's basketball players
Basketball players from Michigan
Joventut Badalona players
Liga ACB players
Sportspeople from Pontiac, Michigan